The Mengshan Giant Buddha is a stone statue located in the city of Taiyuan, Shanxi and was built during the Northern Qi dynasty. Initially discovered in a 1980 census, the statue was found to have its head missing. From 2006 to 2008, people constructed a 12-meter tall head for the statue. The site opened to the public in October 2008.

References 

1980 archaeological discoveries
6th-century works
Buddhist architecture in Taiyuan
Colossal Buddha statues
Mountain monuments and memorials
Northern Qi
Outdoor sculptures in China
Stone sculptures in China
Tourist attractions in Taiyuan